Erwin Steinhauer (born 19 September 1951 in Vienna) is an Austrian actor.

Selected filmography
 Der Sonne entgegen (1985, TV series)
 Sarajevo (2014, TV film)

References

External links 
 
 

Living people
1951 births
Austrian male film actors
Austrian male television actors
Male actors from Vienna
20th-century Austrian male actors
21st-century Austrian male actors